This article lists the winners and nominees for the Black Reel Award for Outstanding Original Soundtrack. This category was retired during the 2008 ceremony.

Winners and nominees
Winners are listed first and highlighted in bold.

2000s

References

Black Reel Awards